Killashee may refer to:
Killashee, County Longford, Irish village
Killashee Round Tower, monastic site in County Kildare, Ireland